Klio may refer to:

 An alternative spelling of Clio, the mythical Muse of history
 84 Klio, an asteroid
 , two ships of Neptun Line, Germany
 Klio, Greece, a village in the northeastern part of Lesbos Island 
 Klio (journal), a journal of ancient history published in Germany
 KFTI, a radio station (1070 AM) licensed to serve Wichita, Kansas, United States, which held the call sign KLIO from 2010 to 2014
 KLIO-FM, initial designation of KLZT, a radio station licensed to Bastrop, Texas
 KLIO-FM, former designation of KMXG, a radio station licensed to Clinton, Iowa

See also
Cleo (disambiguation)
Clio (disambiguation)